Shipley is a ward in the metropolitan borough of the City of Bradford, West Yorkshire, England.  Excluding the listed buildings in the model village of Saltaire, which are the subject of a separate list, it contains 14 listed buildings that are recorded in the National Heritage List for England.  Of these, one is at Grade II*, the middle of the three grades, and the others are at Grade II, the lowest grade.  The listed buildings consist of a farmhouse and a barn, houses, churches and associated structures, a canal bridge and a warehouse, mill buildings, including a chimney, and a war memorial.


Key

Buildings

See also

Listed buildings in Saltaire

References

Citations

Sources

 

Lists of listed buildings in West Yorkshire
Listed